Eddie Edgar (born 31 October 1956) is an English former professional football goalkeeper who played in the Football League First Division, Football League Fourth Division, and the National Soccer League.

Career
Edgar was born in Jarrow and played professionally for Newcastle United, although he made only one appearance for the club in a 4-2 FA Cup quarter-final defeat to Derby County in 1976. In 1976, he signed with Hartlepool United in the Football League Fourth Division. He was loaned to the New York Cosmos of the North America Soccer League to serve as a backup for Shep Messing. In 1980, he went to Canada to play with London City in the National Soccer League.

Managerial career
Edgar coached the University of Waterloo in Waterloo, Ontario and laid the seeds for a program that would eventually reach its first national championship tournament (a year after Edgar left the team). Edgar was appointed as the manager of London City of the Canadian Soccer League to replace cancer fighting Harry Gauss, but was dismissed on 6 June 2008 after a string of poor performances.

Personal life
His son David is also a professional footballer who plays as a central defender.

References

1956 births
Living people
English expatriate footballers
English expatriate sportspeople in the United States
English footballers
English emigrants to Canada
Expatriate soccer players in the United States
Association football goalkeepers
Newcastle United F.C. players
Hartlepool United F.C. players
London City players
Sportspeople from Jarrow
Footballers from Tyne and Wear
Canadian Soccer League (1998–present) managers
Canadian National Soccer League players
English expatriate sportspeople in Canada
Expatriate soccer players in Canada
English football managers